The men's 50 metre team small-bore rifle, standing position was a shooting sports event held as part of the Shooting at the 1920 Summer Olympics programme. It was the only appearance of the event in the standing position, with a similar team competition being held in 1908 and 1912. The competition was held on 2 August 1920. 50 shooters from 10 nations competed.

Results

The scores of the five shooters on each team were the scores from the 50 metre small-bore rifle, standing position event and were summed to give a team score. The maximum score was 2000.

Lawrence Nuesslein won his second gold medal.

References

External links
 Official Report page 154
 

Shooting at the 1920 Summer Olympics